Ajit Kumar Singh also known as Ajit Kumar Kushwaha is an Indian politician and a Member of the Bihar Legislative Assembly from the Dumraon Assembly constituency. Singh has been elected to assembly as a candidate of Communist Party of India (Marxist-Leninist) Liberation. He defeated Anjum Ara of Janata Dal (United) (JDU), as a candidate of Mahagathbandhan (Bihar) in the 2020 Bihar assembly elections. Singh won the tripolar contest, in which apart from JDU's Anjum Ara, former Member of Legislative Assembly from Dumraon, Dadan Pahalwan was also a participant.

Political career
He was one of the youngest candidates contesting the assembly elections in 2020. Singh was a former president for the state of Bihar, of the Revolutionary Youth Association and a former secretary for the state of Bihar of All India Students Association. He completed his doctoral studies in the "history of farmer's agitation" from the Veer Kunwar Singh University and started taking part in political activism, before being elected as a member of the legislative assembly in 2020.

He secured 71,320 votes and defeated the second runner-up Anjum Ara (46,905 votes) in the 2020 Bihar Assembly elections.

See also
Amarjeet Kushwaha

References

Bihar MLAs 2020–2025
Activists from Bihar
Communist Party of India (Marxist–Leninist) Liberation politicians

Living people
Year of birth missing (living people)